Chloe Green may refer to:

Chloe Green, a pseudonym used by US author Suzanne Frank, based in Dallas, Texas
Chloe Jade Green, the daughter of British businessman Philip Green